Anjunabeats Volume 11 is the eleventh installment in the Anjunabeats Volume compilation series mixed and compiled by British trance group Above & Beyond. It was released on 9 June 2014 by Anjunabeats.

Compared to previous compilations, Disc 1 features music more commonly associated with Above & Beyond's side label Anjunadeep. Overall, the album comprised trance, progressive house, deep house, and big room house songs from staple Anjunabeats artists including Maor Levi, Ilan Bluestone, and 16 Bit Lolitas.

Track listing

Release history

References

External links 
 Anjunabeats Volume 11 holding page

2014 compilation albums
Above & Beyond (band) albums
Anjunabeats compilation albums
Sequel albums
Electronic compilation albums